Zelmar Raúl Michelini Guarch (20 May 1924 – 20 May 1976) was a Uruguayan reporter and politician, assassinated in Buenos Aires in 1976 as part of Operation Condor.

Career
Zelmar Michelini was member of the Chamber of Deputies from 1954 to 1958, and then of the Chamber of Senators starting in 1966. He was Minister of the Industry under Oscar Gestido's presidency (Colorado Party), before renouncing in 1970 due to disagreements with the government's policies. At that time, he left the conservative Colorado Party to participate, alongside other left-wing parties (Communist and Socialist Party and other independent left-wing groups), in the foundation of the Frente Amplio ("Broad Front") coalition in 1971. A reporter at the newspaper Acción, he also founded in the 1960s the weekly Hechos. Michelini again became senator in 1971, as a member of the Frente Amplio. However, he had exiled himself to Buenos Aires after the 1973 coup and started denouncing the human rights violations committed by Bordaberry's dictatorship.

Death
Michelini was abducted on 18 May 1976 by a paramilitary group. He was tortured and shot; his body was discovered on 21 May in an abandoned Torino sedan, at the corner of Perito Moreno and Dellepiane in Buenos Aires. Three other bodies were found in the car – Héctor Gutiérrez Ruiz, former Speaker of the Chamber of Deputies of Uruguay, and two Tupamaros militants, William Whitelaw and Rosario del Carmen Barredo, all of whom had also been tortured before they were killed.

Judge Roberto Timbal put former dictator Bordaberry and former Foreign Minister Juan Carlos Blanco Estradé under preventive detention on 16 November 2006, for having orchestrated the murders. Uruguayan police officer Hugo Campos has also been suspected of being responsible.

See also
Operation Condor
List of Uruguayan political families

References

External links

1924 births
1976 deaths
People from Montevideo
Uruguayan people of Italian descent
Uruguayan people of Catalan descent
Colorado Party (Uruguay) politicians
Broad Front (Uruguay) politicians
Ministers of Industries, Energy and Mining of Uruguay
Members of the Chamber of Representatives of Uruguay (1955–1959)
Members of the Chamber of Representatives of Uruguay (1959–1963)
Members of the Chamber of Representatives of Uruguay (1963–1967)
Members of the Senate of Uruguay (1967–1972)
Members of the Senate of Uruguay (1972–1973)
Candidates for President of Uruguay
Assassinated Uruguayan politicians
Uruguayan journalists
20th-century journalists
Uruguayan expatriate journalists
Uruguayan expatriates in Argentina
People killed in Operation Condor
Uruguayan people murdered abroad
People murdered in Argentina
Deaths by firearm in Argentina
Burials at the Central Cemetery of Montevideo